Anthony Smith (born March 16, 1997) is an American professional basketball player for Imortal Basket Club of the Liga Portuguesa de Basquetebol. He played college basketball for Barton Community College and Murray State.

High school career
Smith attended Potomac High School. As a junior, he helped Potomac finish with a 23-5 record and win the Maryland 2A state title. In December 2015, he tore his lateral collateral ligament while going for a dunk in a 76-68 win over Friendly High School.

College career
Smith played two seasons at Barton Community College. As a sophomore, he averaged 12.7 points and 8.3 rebounds per game, helping the team finish 25-8. Smith earned All-Kansas Jayhawk Community College Conference first team honors and was selected to the NJCAA All-Region 6 team. He posted a career-high 32 points and 11 rebounds in a win over Pratt Community College. Smith signed with Murray State in April 2017. As a junior, he averaged 3.6 points and 3.5 rebounds per game. Smith averaged 7.6 points and 5.0 rebounds per game through five games during the 2018-19 season before being sidelined for the rest of the season with an ankle injury. He was granted a fifth season of eligibility in July 2019. On January 18, 2020, he scored a season-high 22 points and grabbed 10 rebounds in a 96-91 overtime win over Southeast Missouri State. As a redshirt senior, Smith averaged 9.4 points, 7.5 rebounds, and 1.1 assists per game.

Professional career
On September 17, 2020, Smith signed his first professional contract with Borac Čačak of the Basketball League of Serbia. He averaged 6.9 points and 3.8 rebounds per game. On August 15, 2021, Smith signed with Imortal Basket Club of the Liga Portuguesa de Basquetebol.

References

External links
Murray State Racers bio

1997 births
Living people
ABA League players
American expatriate basketball people in Serbia
American men's basketball players
Basketball players from Maryland
Barton Cougars men's basketball players
Murray State Racers men's basketball players
KK Borac Čačak players
People from Prince George's County, Maryland
Power forwards (basketball)
African-American baseball players
21st-century African-American sportspeople